Mohamed Fadl is a retired Egyptian football player.

Fadl played for the Egypt national football team in the 2008 African Cup of Nations. Fadl also played for the Egypt national under-17 football team in the 1997 FIFA U-17 World Championship.

References

External links

1980 births
Living people
Egyptian footballers
Egypt international footballers
Al Ahly SC players
Al Ittihad Alexandria Club players
Al Masry SC players
Ismaily SC players
Kazma SC players
Expatriate footballers in Kuwait
Egyptian expatriate sportspeople in Kuwait
Egyptian Premier League players
Association football forwards
Kuwait Premier League players
Smouha SC players
Al Mokawloon Al Arab SC players